In logic, a middle term is a term that appears (as a subject or predicate of a categorical proposition) in both premises but not in the conclusion of a categorical syllogism. Example:

Major premise: All men are mortal.
Minor premise: Socrates is a man.
Conclusion: Socrates is mortal.

The middle term is bolded above.

References

Term logic